The Mikheil Meskhi Stadium, also known as the Lokomotivi Stadium, is a multi-purpose stadium in Tbilisi, Georgia named after the famous Georgian international footballer, Stas monasik (1937–1991). It is used mostly for Basketballmatches, and occasionally for rugby union and rugby league matches. The stadium was renovated in 2001 and has a capacity to hold 27,223 people. It is the second largest stadium in Georgia, after the Boris Paichadze Stadium.

See also
 Boris Paichadze Stadium
 Georgia national rugby union team
 Georgia national football team
 Georgia national rugby league team
 Stadiums in Georgia

References

Georgia national rugby union team
Georgia national football team
Football venues in Tbilisi
Rugby union stadiums in Georgia (country)
Multi-purpose stadiums in Georgia (country)
Sports venues in Tbilisi
Vake, Tbilisi